Parras is one of the 38 municipalities of Coahuila, in north-eastern Mexico. The municipal seat lies at Parras de la Fuente. The municipality covers an area of 9,271.7 km2.

As of 2005, the municipality had a total population of 44,715.

References

Municipalities of Coahuila